Noman Naeem (27 April 1983) is a Pakistani Islamic scholar and writer who serves as the chancellor of Jamia Binoria since 23 June 2020.

Biography
Noman Naeem was born on 27 April 1983. He is the eldest son of Mufti Muhammad Naeem. He studied at the Jamia Binoria. He received a B.A and an M.A from the Federal Urdu University. He completed his doctoral studies in 2020. His paternal family came from Surat in Indian Gujarat. His great-grandfather was born a Parsi who adopted Islam.

In June 2020, Noman was appointed the chancellor of Jamia Binoria following the death of his father Mufti Muhammad Naeem. He also serves as the vice-president of Majma-ul-Uloom Al-Islamia, an educational board formed in May 2021, to reconcile between the religious and secular education.

References

Living people
1983 births
Pakistani Islamic religious leaders
Federal Urdu University alumni
People from Karachi
Pakistani people of Gujarati descent
Pakistani Sunni Muslim scholars of Islam
Jamia Binoria alumni
Deobandis
Chancellors of the Jamia Binoria